Moltema is a locality and small rural community in the local government area of Meander Valley in the North West region of Tasmania.
The 2016 census determined a population of 85 for the state suburb of Moltema.

History
The locality was first named Whitefoord Hills but changed to Moltema in 1915. The name is believed to be an Aboriginal word meaning “to run”.

Geography
The Western rail line passes through from south to north, and the Bass Highway skirts the eastern boundary. The Rubicon River forms a small section of the eastern boundary.

Road infrastructure
The B13 route (Railton Road) enters the locality from the south-east and exits to the north. The C161 route (Dunorlan Road) starts at an intersection with route B13 and runs south into Dunorlan.

References

Localities of Meander Valley Council
Towns in Tasmania